Hopkinton is a town in Middlesex County, Massachusetts, United States,  west of Boston. The town is best known as the starting point of the Boston Marathon, held annually on Patriots' Day each April, and as the headquarters for the Dell EMC corporation.

At the 2020 census, the town had a population of 18,758. The U.S. Census recognizes a village within the town known as Woodville, reporting a population of 2,651 as of the 2020 census.

History
The Town of Hopkinton was incorporated on December 13, 1715. Hopkinton was named for an early colonist of Connecticut, Edward Hopkins, who left a large sum of money to be invested in land in New England, the proceeds of which were to be used for the benefit of Harvard University. The trustees of Harvard purchased 12 500 acres of land from the Native American residents with money from the fund and incorporated the area, naming it in honor of its benefactor.

Grain was the first production crop grown in the area, while fruit and dairy industries were developed later. Agriculture predominated until 1840 when the boot and shoe industries were introduced into the town. By 1850 eleven boot and shoe factories were established in Hopkinton. Fires in 1882 and the migration of those industries to other parts of the country eliminated these industries from Hopkinton.

There are 215 Hopkinton properties listed in the State Register of Historic Places. The majority, 187, are located within the Cedar Swamp Archaeological District in Hopkinton and Westborough. The properties are also listed in the National Register of Historic Places.

Twenty-three properties are included within the Hopkinton Center Historic District, a local historic district which comprises properties around the Town Common, on East Main St. and the south side of Main St. The district was expanded in 2000 to include the Town Hall and in 2001 to include Center School. The Hopkinton Supply Company Building on Main St., located slightly west of the district, is listed in the National Register of Historic Places. Former factory worker housing in the center of town, contrasted against the more rural areas surrounding it, are visual reminders of Hopkinton's past.

In 2005 the town established a second historic district in the village of Woodville. Ninety-seven properties are included within this district. The village of Woodville has retained its distinctive village atmosphere and strong architectural connection to Hopkinton's industrial development and growth from the mid-to-late 19th century. The area was an early cotton clothmaking center and the site of a major shoe factory. When Boston seized Lake Whitehall for its water supply in 1894, the factories along its shores were closed or moved to other sites, as they were considered sources of pollution. Remaining factories and other buildings were destroyed in a fire in 1909. In the 18th century, it was an agricultural area with a few farms scattered north of the much smaller Lake Whitehall and its accompanying cedar swamp, and was the site of a grist mill on Whitehall Brook as early as 1714.

Within or near the Miscoe-Warren-Whitehall Watersheds ACEC (Area of Critical Environmental Concern), remains of large pits have been found. The pits were lined with bark by the Native Americans and used to store corn over the winter months.

At one time, it was believed that the waters flowing from the large swamp south of Pond St., under Pond St. and into Lake Whitehall contained magical healing powers. As a result, the area quickly was built up as a resort area. Visitors came by stagecoach to the Hopkinton Hotel, which was located between Pond St. and the lake. The mineral baths and their powers lured the visitors to the area. The baths can still be viewed by the edge of the stream that drains from the swamp. Their origin and use are unknown.

Hopkinton gains national attention once a year in April as it hosts the start of the Boston Marathon, a role the town has enjoyed since 1924. The town takes pride in its hospitality as runners from all over the world gather in Hopkinton to begin the  run to Boston. It is also a sister city of Marathon, Greece.

Geography

Adjacent towns
Hopkinton is located in eastern Massachusetts, bordered by six towns:

Climate
The climate in Hopkinton tends to be hot and humid during the summer, with daily high temperatures averaging in the 80s. Temperatures in the 90s are also known to occur between June and August as high-pressure air masses push in from the south. Winters are typical of areas inland and west of Boston. Snowfall averages around 45" but can vary tremendously from season to season.

The coldest month of the year is January with an average minimum and maximum temperature of  respectively.

Rainfall is fairly evenly distributed throughout the year.

Demographics

Between the 2010 census and 2020 census, Hopkinton was the fastest-growing community in Greater Boston.

As of the census of 2010, there were 14,925 people, 4,957 households, and 3,978 families residing in the town. The racial makeup of the town was 93.1% White, 0.8% Black or African American, 0.1% Native American, 4.4% Asian, 0.4% from other races, and 1.2% from two or more races. Hispanic or Latino of any race were 1.8% of the population.

There were 4,957 households, out of which 48.1% had children under the age of 18 living with them, 70.5% were married couples living together, 6.9% had a female householder with no husband present, and 19.7% were non-families. 16.0% of all households were made up of individuals, and 5.6% had someone living alone who was 65 years of age or older. The average household size was 2.99 and the average family size was 3.38.

Population was well-distributed by age, with 33.6% under the age of 20, 3.4% from 20 to 24, 22.0% from 25 to 44, 33.0% from 45 to 64, and 7.9% who were 65 years of age or older. The median age was 40.3 years. For every 100 females, there were 96.8 males. For every 100 females age 18 and over, there were 93.4 males.

As of 2000, the median income for a household in the town was $89,281, and the median income for a family was $102,550. Males had a median income of $71,207 versus $42,360 for females. The per capita income for the town was $41,469. About 1.3% of families and 1.7% of the population were below the poverty line, including 1.4% of those under age 18 and 3.4% of those age 65 or over.

Hopkinton village
As of the census of 2000, there were 2,628 people, 1,003 households, and 672 families residing in the CDP. The population density was 611.3/km2 (1,584.3/mi2). There were 1,024 housing units at an average density of 238.2/km2 (617.3/mi2). The racial makeup of the CDP was 97.14% White, 0.38% Black or African American, 0.15% Native American, 0.91% Asian, 0.08% Pacific Islander, 0.68% from other races, and 0.65% from two or more races. Hispanic or Latino of any race were 2.05% of the population.

There were 1,003 households, out of which 34.5% had children under the age of 18 living with them, 55.4% were married couples living together, 9.2% had a female householder with no husband present, and 33.0% were non-families. 28.9% of all households were made up of individuals, and 14.5% had someone living alone who was 65 years of age or older. The average household size was 2.52 and the average family size was 3.17.

In the CDP the population was spread out, with 26.5% under the age of 18, 4.3% from 18 to 24, 32.0% from 25 to 44, 20.5% from 45 to 64, and 16.7% who were 65 years of age or older. The median age was 38 years. For every 100 females, there were 85.7 males. For every 100 females age 18 and over, there were 82.3 males.

The median income for a household in the CDP was $52,250, and the median income for a family was $68,050. Males had a median income of $48,050 versus $37,862 for females. The per capita income for the CDP was $23,878. About 2.9% of families and 3.3% of the population were below the poverty line, including 5.1% of those under age 18 and 4.0% of those age 65 or over.

Government
Since its incorporation in 1715, Hopkinton has retained its original Open Town Meeting form of government. The town's day-to-day affairs had been directly overseen by an elected Board of Selectmen until 2007, when the Town's Charter Commission created a Town Manager position with more discretion, although the Town Manager still reports to the Select Board.

Annual Town Meeting
Hopkinton's Annual Town Meeting begins on the first Monday in May, hosted at the Hopkinton Middle School or High School. The meeting only begins when a quorum is formed, with 128 registered Hopkinton voters in attendance. It continues on consecutive evenings, usually three nights in total, until all articles in the Town Meeting Warrant have been voted upon.

Warrant
The Town Meeting Warrant is a document composed of the articles to be voted upon. Any elected or appointed board, committee, or town officer, or ten petitioning voters, may request that an article be included on the warrant. Each article to be voted upon is directed by the Select Board to an appropriate board or committee to hear and provide the original motion at Town Meeting. All articles which require expending of funds are directed to the Finance Committee; articles dealing with planning and zoning to the Planning Board; articles relating to by-laws to the By-Law Committee, and so forth.

Annual Town Election
Hopkinton Annual Town Election is held on the third Monday in May. Polls are open 7:00am–8:00pm. All Hopkinton precincts vote at the Hopkinton Middle School.

County government
Massachusetts has 14 counties which were regional administrative districts before the Revolutionary War. In 1997, the county governments of Middlesex, Berkshire, Essex, Hampden and Worcester were abolished. Many of their functions were turned over to state agencies.

Its county seats are Cambridge and Lowell.

Library
The Hopkinton Public Library was founded in 1867. It has been located in the heart of downtown, just steps away from the Town Common, since 1895. Until 1955, bequests were the only source of funding for the library. Since that time, the town government has been appropriating public funds for employee salaries, cost of cleaning the Library, utilities and assistance with the purchase of books. The library is now funded through various sources that include the Town Government, The McGovern Trust Fund, Annual State Aid and Friends of the Library.

The town library was established by the Young Men's Christian Association in 1867. Seven members served as the Trustees, incorporated the Library and adopted by-laws for the government of the Library in 1890. The current building was built in 1895 with contributions from local and former residents of Hopkinton. The second floor was used as a lecture hall and was remodeled later as a children's room. A gallery was built to connect the Library building with the adjacent Episcopal Church after extensive renovation in 1967. This new section was named after the head librarian at the time, Mrs. Betty Strong. A special feature of the reading room is a stained glass window with a motif of water fountain bubbling water flowing over an open book and the inscription on the page reads "The fountain of wisdom flows through books." The large hall clock that still stands near the circulation desk was presented to the Library by Mrs. F.V. Thompson and Mr. Abram Crooks.

The library was transferred to the town government in May 2010. Five members were appointed as the Library Trustees. Starting from May 2011, elections have been held annually for the members of the Library Board according to the new town charter.

In January 2016, the library announced they would make renovations to the building and moved to a temporary location at 65 South Street while the historic building on Main Street undergoes a major renovation and expansion.

In October 2017, the renovated and expanded library reopened in its downtown location at 13 Main Street.

Education

Public schools
The Town of Hopkinton has a public school system which serves students from pre-kindergarten through twelfth grade. Kindergarten students and first-graders attend Marathon Elementary School. Grades 2 and 3 attend Elmwood School. Grades 4 and 5 attend Hopkins School. Grades 6 through 8 attend Hopkinton Middle School. Grades 9 through 12 attend Hopkinton High School. The town also has an integrated preschool currently located in the Marathon Elementary School building.

Hopkinton offered a fee-based full-day kindergarten option for the first time during the 2010–2011 school year via a lottery system. Free full-day Kindergarten was made available to all Kindergarten students starting in the 2014–2015 school year. Hopkinton Public Schools does not offer any foreign language education before Grade 7.

Since residents approved the Center School Feasibility Study in May 2008, Hopkinton had been involved in an Elementary School Building Project with the Massachusetts School Building Authority. The solution approved unanimously by the Hopkinton Elementary School Building Committee and the MSBA was to build a new K–5 Elementary School on the town-owned Fruit Street property and then decommission the aging Center School. Residents voted down the new school at the March 21, 2011 Special Town Meeting and again at a Special Town Election on March 28, 2011.

In May 2013 voters approved funding a new Center School Feasibility Study. The solution proposed by the new Elementary School Building Committee was to build a new Preschool, Kindergarten and Grade 1 School at 135 Hayden Rowe Street (Route 85), on property newly purchased by the town for this purpose. This proposal was approved by voters at a November 2015 Special Town Meeting. The new Marathon Elementary School, named after a public town survey, is located on Route 85 in Hopkinton, and opened for the fall 2018 school year.

Hopkinton High's school mascot is the Hiller "H", as the sports teams are known as the Hopkinton Hillers. Previously the teams were known as the Hopkinton Stonethrowers. The school primary colors are green and white, with orange as a secondary color.

Economy and business
Hopkinton is the corporate headquarters of Dell EMC, a global manufacturer of software and systems for information management and storage. Dell EMC, in addition to providing $1 million in annual real estate tax revenues, is a major contributor to the town's schools and recreational services.
On September 7, 2016, Dell and EMC merged, creating Dell EMC.

Transportation
Interstate Route 495 divides the town into east and west zones, which are connected by numerous spokes providing direct access to the airport and other communities in the Greater Boston Metropolitan Area.

Major highways
Hopkinton is served by two interstate highways and two state highways. Interstates 90 (the Massachusetts Turnpike) and 495, form an interchange on the northern border of Hopkinton and neighboring Westborough. Proximity to Route 9 (The Boston/Worcester Turnpike) and Route 30 in Westborough, gives additional access to east/west destinations.

Principal highways are:
 Interstate 90 (Massachusetts Turnpike) (east/west) (the longest interstate highway in the United States)
 Interstate 495 (north/south)
 State Route 135 (east/west)
 State Route 85 (north/south)

Nearby major intersections
  Interstate 495 in Westborough, Massachusetts
  Interstate 95 in Weston, Massachusetts

Mass transit

Rail
There is no passenger or freight rail service in Hopkinton.

Hopkinton is served by the Southborough MBTA Station, located on the border of Hopkinton and Southborough on Route 85 at Southville Road. MBTA commuter rail service is available to South Station and Back Bay Station, Boston, via the MBTA Framingham-Worcester Commuter Rail Line which connects South Station in Boston and Union Station in Worcester. Travel time to Back Bay is about 50 minutes.

Originally called the Framingham Commuter Rail Line, Framingham was the end of the line until rail traffic was expanded to Worcester in 1996. The line also serves the communities of Newton, Wellesley, Natick, Ashland, Southborough, Westborough and Grafton.

Direct rail service to Boston, to New York, and to many other points on the Amtrak network (National Railroad Passenger Corporation) is available through nearby Framingham.

CSX Transportation provides freight rail service and operates an auto transloading facility in nearby Framingham.

Bus
 Hopkinton is a Member Community of the MetroWest Regional Transit Authority, which provides local bus service to several towns in the MetroWest area, with service to the MBTA commuter rail station at Framingham.
 Peter Pan Bus Lines provides service to Worcester and Boston from Framingham.

Air
Boston's Logan International Airport is easily accessible from nearby Framingham. MassPort provides public transportation to all airport terminals from Framingham via the Logan Express bus service seven days per week. The bus terminal and paid parking facility are located on the Shoppers' World Mall property, off the Massachusetts Turnpike Exit 13, between Route 9 and Route 30, at the intersections of East Road and the Burr Street connector.

Worcester Regional Airport, a Primary Commercial (PR) facility with scheduled passenger service, is easily accessible. Instrument approaches available include precision and non-precision. The airport is served by JetBlue, American Eagle, and Delta.

Commuter services
Park and ride services:
 MassDOT operates a free park and ride facility at the parking lot at the intersection of Flutie Pass and East Road on the south side of Shoppers' World Mall.
 MassDOT also operates a free park and ride facility at a parking lot adjacent to exit 12 of the Massachusetts Turnpike, across from California Avenue on the west side of Framingham.

Media

Newspapers
Hopkinton has two local newspapers: The Hopkinton Independent and The Hopkinton Crier, and three online news outlets, HCAM, Hopkinton Patch and HopNews. The town is also served by The Boston Globe, The MetroWest Daily News, and the Telegram & Gazette.

Television
Hopkinton has a PEG television network known as HCAM, which controls two channels. Many HCAM shows can be viewed directly on their website.

HCAM-TV
HCAM-TV is the most-received of HCAM's channels, available in every household with cable television in the area. It can be found on Comcast channel 8 and Verizon channel 30. The channel's daily schedule consists mostly of programming aimed at a family audience. Along with series and informative programming, HCAM-TV broadcasts the filming of one-time events (such as performances on the Hopkinton Common and films by the Hopkinton Center for the Arts).

HCAM-ED
HCAM-ED, sister channel to HCAM-TV, is received by fewer households and has lower programming standards than HCAM-TV. It is found on Comcast channel 96 and Verizon channel 31. The HCAM website also includes news articles and photos, updated daily.

Points of interest
 Hopkinton State Park, located on Route 85 (Cordaville Road), is a Massachusetts state park managed by the Department of Conservation and Recreation, that was created after the Hopkinton Reservoir was removed from service as a water source for the Greater Boston area.
 Whitehall State Park, located on Route 135 (Wood Street), is a Massachusetts state park managed by the Department of Conservation and Recreation. It was created in 1947, when the Whitehall Reservoir was removed from service as a water source for the Greater Boston area.

Accolades
2020 – Hopkinton Public Schools was ranked #15 of all 412 public school districts in Massachusetts
2014 – Hopkinton made the 'SafeWise 50 Safest Cities in Massachusetts' 
2013  – National Citizen Survey results conducted by the National Research Center 
2012 – Hopkinton ranked 4th in the Central MA's Best Communities 2012 round-up 
2009 – Money magazine ranks Hopkinton 19th best place to live

Culture
 Beginning in 1924, when the Boston Athletic Association chose to move the start line from Ashland, MA, Hopkinton has garnered worldwide attention as the starting point of the annual Boston Marathon.

Sister cities
 Marathon, Greece

Places of worship
Community Covenant Church
Faith Community Church of Hopkinton
Islamic Masumeen Center
Korean Presbyterian Church
The Sanctuary at Woodville (formerly Woodville Baptist Church)
St John the Evangelist
St Paul's Episcopal Church
Vineyard Church of Hopkinton

Notable people

Military
 Michael Joseph Lenihan (1865–1958), United States Army general during World War I
 Frank Merrill (1903–1955), United States Army general during World War II
 Daniel Shays (1747–1825), soldier, revolutionary and farmer—leader of Shays' Rebellion
 Daniel Shays Road, a street in Hopkinton off of Saddle Hill Road, is named after him
 Charles F. Walcott (1836–1888), Union Army officer during the American Civil War

Politics
 Joseph Bowker (1725–1784),  first Speaker of the Vermont House of Representatives
 William Chamberlain (1755–1828), United States Representative from Vermont (1803–1805; 1809–1811)
 William Claflin (1818–1905), industrialist, philanthropist, 27th Governor of Massachusetts, United States Representative (1877–1881)
 Paul Danahy (1928–2022), politician and judge in Florida
 John Locke (1764–1855), United States Representative (1804–1805, 1813, 1823)
 Charles Morris (1731–1802), surveyor, judge and political figure in Nova Scotia
 Abbott Barnes Rice (1862–1926), Boston merchant and politician
 William H. Ryan (1860–1939), United States Representative from New York (1899–1909)
 Joseph H. Walker (1829–1907), United States Representative (1889–1899)

Religion
 Edward L. Hearn (1865–1945), fifth Supreme Knight of the Knights of Columbus
 Levi Richards (1799–1876), religious leader in the Latter Day Saint movement
 Willard Richards (1804–1854), religious leader in the Latter Day Saint movement
 Joseph Young (1797–1881), missionary in the Latter Day Saint movement, brother of Brigham Young

Sports

 Keegan Bradley (born 1986), professional golfer
 George V. Brown (1880–1937), sports organizer in United States, 30-year starter of Boston marathon, and hockey hall of fame inductee
 Walter A. Brown (1905–1964), founding owner of the Boston Celtics and inductee into the basketball and hockey halls of fame
 Jon Curran (born 1987), professional golfer
 Sean Farrell (born 2001), ice hockey player
 Justin Harney (born 1977), ice hockey player
 Toss Kelly (1862–1924), professional baseball umpire

Other

 Susannah Valentine Aldrich (1828–1905), author and hymnwriter
 Richard Egan (1936–2009), founder of EMC Corporation, 19th United States Ambassador to Ireland
 Agnes Surriage Frankland (1726–1783), wife of Sir Charles Henry Frankland, a British baronet
 M. Laurance Morse (1921–2003), microbiologist
 Richard Potter (1783–1835), magician, hypnotist and ventriloquist
 Grace Vollmer (1884–1977), painter

Historic homes

Historical commission
The Town of Hopkinton established a historical commission which manages "the preservation, protection and development of the historical or archeological assets of such city or town". Projects include conducting research for places of historic or archeological value, assisting cooperatively with others engaged in such research, and carrying out other initiatives for the purpose of protecting and preserving such places.

National Register of Historic Places
Hopkinton has two properties in the register.
Cedar Swamp Archeological District, Address Restricted. Listed 1988-05-23
Hopkinton Supply Company Building, 26-28 Main Street. Listed 1983-03-10

See also
 Greater Boston
 MetroWest
 Boston Marathon
 Dell EMC
 Open town meeting format

References

Further reading

 Hopkinton Community Profile in The Boston Globe, 2003
 Hopkinton Listing in MetroWest Chamber of Commerce
 The story of Violet and Iris Carey – killed in a natural gas explosion in downtown Hopkinton, 2002
 1871 Atlas of Massachusetts. by Wall & Gray. Map of Massachusetts. Map of Middlesex County.
 History of Middlesex County, Massachusetts, Volume 1 (A-H), (L-W) compiled by Samuel Adams Drake, published 1879–1880. 572 and 505 pages.  Hopkinton article by Rev. Elias Nason in volume 1, pages 483–495

External links
 Town of Hopkinton official website
 Hopkinton Public Schools
 Hopkinton State Park

 
MetroWest
Towns in Middlesex County, Massachusetts
Towns in Massachusetts
Populated places established in 1715
1715 establishments in Massachusetts